Jens Erichstrup (10 November 1775 – 18 August 1826) was a Norwegian jurist and elected official. He served as a representative at the 
Norwegian Constitutional Assembly at Eidsvoll in 1814.

Jens Erichstrup was born in  Skien in Telemark, Norway. He received an education in law and graduated as cand.jur. in 1798.
From 1801 to 1810 he worked in the Treasury (Rentekammeret), the first two years as copyist, later as proxy.  He was appointed bailiff of Lister in Vest-Agder during 1810. He was elected to the Norwegian Constituent Assembly in 1814, representing the constituency of Lister Amt, together with Gabriel Lund and Teis Lundegaard. At Eidsvoll, he supported the position of the union party (Unionspartiet).

In 1818, he was appointed bailiff in Laurvig. He was also elected in 1818 as a representative from Lister og Mandals amt (now Vest-Agder) to the Norwegian Parliament  where he served as secretary on the election and the budget committees. He subsequently became acting County Governor of Jarlsbergs og Laurvigs Amt. While serving there, he was elected to the Norwegian Parliament in 1821 as a representative from Laurvig Grevskab (now Larvik) and in 1824 representing Jarlsberg og Laurviks amt (now Vestfold). Erichstrup was then County Governor of Stavanger Amt (now Rogaland) from 1825 until his death.

References

External links
Representantene på Eidsvoll 1814 (Cappelen Damm AS)
 Men of Eidsvoll (eidsvollsmenn)

Related Reading

1775 births
1826 deaths
Fathers of the Constitution of Norway
Members of the Storting
Vest-Agder politicians
Vestfold politicians
County governors of Norway
Norwegian jurists
Politicians from Skien